D59 or D-59 may be:

 HMAS Anzac (D59), a Battle class destroyer of the Royal Australian Navy
 HMCS Skeena (D59), an A class destroyer of the Royal Canadian Navy
 Queen's Gambit Declined, in the classification system of the Encyclopaedia of Chess Openings
 D59 road (Croatia), a state road in Croatia
 HMS Ceres (D59)
 D59 (Antarctica), a field camp in Antarctica